Tambuco is a percussion-ensemble work for six players, written by the Mexican composer Carlos Chávez in 1964. The score is dedicated to Clare Boothe Luce, and a performance of it lasts approximately thirteen minutes.

History

The impulse to compose Tambuco came about in an unusual way. In 1950, Clare Boothe Luce had commissioned Chávez's Third Symphony, completed in 1954. Their unlikely friendship continued for nearly three decades and, after Luce began working in mosaics in 1963, they agreed to exchange commissions for works from each other. For Chávez, Luce created a 4' x 5' mosaic titled Golden Tiger, which he hung in his Lomas de Chapultepec studio in Mexico City. In return, he created Tambuco. 

The premiere took place on 11 October 1965 in the Leo S. Bing Theater at the Los Angeles County Museum of Art, performed by the Los Angeles Percussion Ensemble conducted by William Kraft. Both Chávez and Luce were in the audience.

Instrumentation
Each of the six performers plays a battery of at least six different instruments. Pitched percussion is found in each of the players' groups, which also each include wood, metal, and membrane instruments. The total array is:

Percussion I:
Small rasping stick 
Small water gourd
Glockenspiel
Small claves
Very small bongo set
Medium bongo set
Percussion II:
Large rasping stick 
Large water gourd 
Large suspended cymbal
Swiss brass bells 
Wood block 
Group of drums:
Small snare drum 
Medium snare drum 
Tenor drum

Percussion III:
Metal rattle (or shaken tambourine)
Maraca
Triangle 
Tubular chimes
Large claves
Four timpani
Percussion IV:
Clay (or hard cardboard) rattle 
Soft rattle (soft cardboard or straw)
Maraca
Very large crash cymbals
Marimba
Extra-large claves
Group of drums:
Small tom tom 
Large tom tom 
Conga

Percussion V: 
Small güiro
Large güiro (shared with Percussion VI)
Extra-large ratchet
Tap-a-tap (two rectangular pieces of thin wood with handles)
Celesta
Extra-large gong 
Group of drums:
Small snare drum 
Medium snare drum 
Tenor drum
Xylophone (shared with Percussion VI)
Percussion VI: 
Sand blocks (two sets, with rough and fine sandpaper)
Large güiro (shared with Percussion V)
Very small suspended cymbal
Vibraphone (three octaves)
Xylophone (shared with Percussion V)
Group of drums:
Small bass drum
Large bass drum

Analysis
Instead of the conventional procedures of thematic repetition and development, Tambuco unfolds in what the composer describes as "a constant process of consequent evolution. That is to say, an initial idea serves as an 'antecedent' to a 'consequent', which in turn immediately becomes an antecedent to a new consequent, and so on until the end of the piece". Chávez elsewhere characterizes such a procedure as being "like a spiral".

The work falls into three main sections, each characterized by the predominance of certain instruments: 
 Rasps, rattles, and blocks (b. 1–158) 
 Definite-pitched instruments (glockenspiel, celesta, vibraphone, chimes, and marimba, b. 159–207), ending with a xylophone transition passage (b. 208–15)
 Timpani, bongos, conga, and bass drums (b. 216–283).
This main structure is followed by a coda (beginning in b. 284) in which the definite-pitched instruments gradually re-enter, leading to an abrupt ending.

References

Footnotes

Further reading
 

Compositions by Carlos Chávez
1964 compositions
Percussion music